Taha Yasin Ramadan al-Jizrawi ((1939 – 20 March 2007) was an Iraqi politician and military officer of Kurdish origin,  who served as one of the three vice presidents of Iraq from March 1991 to the fall of Saddam Hussein in April 2003.

Following the fall of Saddam's government, Taha Yasin Ramadan was placed on the U.S. list of most-wanted Iraqis and depicted as the Ten of Diamonds in the most-wanted Iraqi playing cards. He was captured on August 19, 2003, in Mosul, by fighters of the Patriotic Union of Kurdistan (PUK) and handed over to US forces.

He was one of the defendants in the Iraq Special Tribunal's Al-Dujail trial. On 5 November 2006, he was sentenced to life imprisonment. On 26 December 2006, the appeals court sent the case file back to the Tribunal, saying the sentence was too lenient and demanding a death sentence. On 12 February 2007, he was sentenced to death by hanging. His sentence was carried out on the fourth anniversary of Iraq's US invasion, before dawn on 20 March 2007.

Proposed resolution to United States–Iraq conflict

In October 2002, four months before the United States invaded Iraq, Ramadan suggested U.S. President George W. Bush and Saddam Hussein settle their difference in a duel. He reasoned this would not only serve as an alternative to a war that was certain to damage Iraq's infrastructure, but that it would also reduce the suffering of the Iraqi and American peoples. Ramadan's offer included the possibility that a group of US officials would face off with a group of Iraqi officials of same or similar rank (President v. President, Vice President v. Vice President, etc.). Ramadan proposed that the duel be held in a neutral land, with each party using the same weapons, and with UN Secretary General Kofi Annan presiding as the supervisor. On behalf of Bush, White House Press Secretary Ari Fleischer declined the offer.

References

21st-century executions by Iraq
1938 births
2007 deaths
Vice presidents of Iraq
People executed by Iraq by hanging
Iraqi Kurdish people
Kurdish politicians
People from Mosul
Iraqi Sunni Muslims
Iraqi people convicted of crimes against humanity
Executed Iraqi people
Executed Kurdish people
Members of the Regional Command of the Arab Socialist Ba'ath Party – Iraq Region
People executed for crimes against humanity
Iraqi politicians convicted of crimes
People of the 1991 uprisings in Iraq
Heads of government who were later imprisoned
Executed mass murderers
Most-wanted Iraqi playing cards
Iraq War prisoners of war
Iraqi prisoners of war